The Buckland River (Kaŋiq in Inupiaq) is a stream,  long, in the U.S. state of Alaska.

Naval officer Frederick William Beechey named the river in 1826 for a geology professor at the University of Oxford in England. Other 19th-century names for the river included Russian translations of the Inuit as Kanyk and the Koyukon Indian as Kotsokhotana. Another translation of the Inuit was Kung-uk.

See also
List of rivers of Alaska

References

Drainage basins of the Chukchi Sea
Rivers of the Seward Peninsula
Rivers of Northwest Arctic Borough, Alaska
Rivers of Alaska